Hưng Thành may refer to the following places in Vietnam:

Hưng Thành, Tuyên Quang, a ward of Tuyên Quang city
Hưng Thành, Bạc Liêu, a commune of Vĩnh Lợi District